The vaquero is a horse-mounted livestock herder of a tradition that has its roots in the Iberian Peninsula and extensively developed in Mexico from a methodology brought to Latin America from Spain. The vaquero became the foundation for the North American cowboy. The vaqueros of the Americas were the horsemen and cattle herders of New Spain, who first came to California with the Jesuit priest Eusebio Kino in 1687, and later with expeditions in 1769 and the Juan Bautista de Anza expedition in 1774. They were the first cowboys in the region.

In Northern Mexico, Southwestern United States, and Western Canada, the remnants of major and distinct vaquero traditions remain, most popular today as the Californio (California), Neomexicano (New Mexico), and Tejano (Texas) traditions. In Central and South America, as well as the Asia-Pacific, there are related traditions.

The cowboys of the Great Basin still use the term "buckaroo", which may be a corruption of vaquero, to describe themselves and their tradition. Many in Llano Estacado and along the southern Rio Grande prefer the term vaquero. While the indigenous and Hispanic communities in the age-old Nuevo México and New Mexico Territory regions use the term caballero, this term is likewise used in the Andes regions of South America.

Etymology

Vaquero is a Spanish word for a herder of cattle. It derives from vaca, meaning "cow", which in turn comes from the Latin word vacca.

A related term, buckaroo, still is used to refer to a certain style of cowboys and horsemanship most often seen in the Great Basin region of the United States that closely retains characteristics of the traditional vaquero. The word buckaroo is generally believed to be an anglicized version of vaquero and shows phonological characteristics compatible with that origin. Buckaroo first appeared in American English in 1827. The word may also have developed with influences from the English word "buck" or bucking, the behavior of young, untrained horses. Although that derivation was later rejected, another possibility advanced was that "buckaroo" was a pun on vaquero, blending both Spanish and African sources.

History

The origins of the vaquero tradition come from Spain, beginning with the hacienda system of medieval Spain. This style of cattle ranching spread throughout much of the Iberian peninsula, and it was later imported to the Americas. Both regions possessed a dry climate with sparse grass, and thus large herds of cattle required vast amounts of land in order to obtain sufficient forage. The need to cover distances greater than a person on foot could manage gave rise to the development of the horseback-mounted vaquero. Various aspects of the Spanish equestrian tradition can be traced back to Al-Andalus, including Moorish elements such as the use of Oriental-type horses, the jinete riding style characterized by a shorter stirrup, solid-treed saddle and use of spurs, the heavy noseband or hackamore, ( šakīma, Spanish jaquima). Certain aspects of the Arabic tradition, such as the hackamore, can in turn be traced to roots in ancient Persia.

Arrival in the Americas

During the 16th century, the Conquistadors and other Spanish settlers brought their cattle-raising traditions as well as both horses and domesticated cattle to the Americas, starting with their arrival in what today is Mexico and Florida. The traditions of Spain were transformed by the geographic, environmental and cultural circumstances of New Spain, which later became Mexico and the Southwestern United States. They also developed this culture in all of western Latin America, developing the Gaucho cowboys in Argentina, Chile and Peru the land and people of the Americas also saw dramatic changes due to Spanish influence.

In Brazil, the "vaqueiro" (in Brazilian Portuguese) appeared in the 16th century, in the interior, specifically in the caatinga areas in the state of Bahia.

The arrival of horses in the Americas was particularly significant, as equines had been extinct there since the end of the prehistoric ice age. However, horses quickly multiplied in America and became crucial to the success of the Spanish and later settlers from other nations. The earliest horses were originally of Spanish, Barb and Arabian ancestry, but a number of uniquely American horse breeds developed in North and South America through selective breeding and by natural selection of animals that escaped to the wild and became feral. The Mustang and other colonial horse breeds are now called "wild", but in reality are feral horses—descendants of domesticated animals.

16th to 19th centuries

The Spanish tradition evolved further in what today is Mexico, and the Southwestern United States into the vaquero of northern Mexico and the charro of the Jalisco and Michoacán regions. Most vaqueros were men of mestizo origin while most of the hacendados (ranch owners) were ethnically Spanish. In Santa Fe de Nuevo México, however, both Hispano and Pueblo people owned land and livestock. Mexican traditions spread both South and North, influencing equestrian traditions from Argentina to Canada.

As English-speaking traders and settlers expanded westward, English and Spanish traditions, language and culture merged to some degree. Before the Mexican–American War in 1848, New England merchants who traveled by ship to California encountered both hacendados and vaqueros, trading manufactured goods for the hides and tallow produced from vast cattle ranches. American traders along what later became known as the Santa Fe Trail had similar contacts with vaquero life. Starting with these early encounters, the lifestyle and language of the vaquero began a transformation which merged with English cultural traditions and produced what became known in American culture as the "cowboy".

Mesteñeros were vaqueros that caught, broke and drove Mustangs to market in the Spanish and later Mexican, and then American territories. They caught the horses that roamed the Great Plains and the San Joaquin Valley of California, and later in the Great Basin, from the 18th century to the early 20th century.

Modern United States
The vaquero heritage had an influence on cowboy traditions which arose throughout the California, Hawaii, Montana, New Mexico, Texas, and broader Western United States, distinguished by their own local culture, geography and historical patterns of settlement. The Southwestern United States has a caballero heritage that originates in New Mexico's Hispanic and indigenous groups from the region, whereas the "Texas" vaquero tradition melded Tejano techniques with ranching styles of eastern states from Louisiana to Florida, while the "buckaroo" or "California" tradition resembled Northern Mexico traditions. The modern distinction between caballero, vaquero, and buckaroo within American English reflects parallels between traditions of western horsemanship.

American Southwest
In the Southwestern United States, the Hispano, Pueblo, Navajo, and Apache traditions of Santa Fe de Nuevo México continue to hold significant influence over cowboy lifestyles in the region. This area became the New Mexico Territory and eventually the Southwestern US states of New Mexico, Arizona, and the southern portions of Colorado, Nevada, and Utah. Descendants of the Hispano and indigenous cowboys of former Nuevo México have long been referred to as caballero or caballera, a Spanish term which translates to gentlemen or lady, but regionally means cowboy or cowgirl.

California tradition
Cowboys of this tradition were dubbed buckaroos by English-speaking settlers. The words buckaroo and vaquero are still used on occasion in the Great Basin, parts of California and, less often, in the Pacific Northwest. Elsewhere, the term "cowboy" is more common.

Even though the lands of the California vaquaros were fertile for farming, "it was not the disposition of Spanish Californians to over-exert themselves, so the raising of cattle, which was little drain on the energies, was a very much more agreeable way of life than farming ... there were few in the world who could surpass ... [the] vaquero in horsemanship." The future Mexican or Spanish vaqueros were placed in the saddle at 5 years of age, and sometimes earlier, and worked with young, often trained horses, which had originally arrived from Mexico in the 18th century and flourished in California and bordering territories during the Spanish/Mexican era. Settlers originally arriving from the United States prior to 1846 (Mexican War) could marry a Californio woman or apply for Mexican citizenship in order to receive a land grant, which would then almost require the new citizen to acquire the vaquaro skills and life styles, a life style in which he would "invariably [keep] a horse saddled before his door, awaiting his pleasure.  If it was necessary to go more than fifty steps, he rode."  After the conquest of California, with the conclusion of the Mexican–American War in 1848, Americans began to flood the newly conquered territory with immigration, for the 1849 goldrush, which resulted in most of them being miners rather than livestock ranchers. The California vaquero or buckaroo, unlike the Texas cowboy, was considered a highly skilled worker, who usually stayed on the same ranch where he was born or had grown up. He generally married and raised a family. In addition, the geography and climate of much of California was dramatically different from that of Texas, allowing more intensive grazing with less open range, plus cattle in California were marketed primarily at a regional level, without the need (nor, until much later, even the logistical possibility) to be driven hundreds of miles to railroad lines. Thus, a horse- and livestock-handling culture remained in California and the Pacific Northwest that retained a stronger direct Mexican and Spanish influence than that of Texas.

Texas tradition

The Texas tradition arose from a combination of cultural influences, as well as the need to adapt to the geography and climate of west Texas and, later, the need to conduct long cattle drives to get animals to market. In the early 1800s, the Spanish Crown, and later, independent Mexico, offered empresario grants in what would later be Texas to non-citizens, such as settlers from the United States. In 1821, Stephen F. Austin and his East Coast comrades became the first Anglo-Saxon community in Texas. Following Texas independence in 1836, even more Americans immigrated into the empresario ranching areas of Texas. Here the settlers were strongly influenced by the Mexican vaquero culture, borrowing vocabulary and attire from their counterparts, but also retaining some of the livestock-handling traditions and culture of the Eastern United States and Great Britain.

Following the American Civil War, vaquero culture diffused eastward and northward, combining with the cow herding traditions of the eastern United States that evolved as settlers moved west. Other influences developed out of Texas as cattle trails were created to meet up with the railroad lines of Kansas and Nebraska, in addition to expanding ranching opportunities in the Great Plains and Rocky Mountain Front, east of the Continental Divide. The Texas-style vaquero tended to be an itinerant single male who moved from ranch to ranch.

Hawaiian paniolo
The Hawaiian cowboy, the paniolo, is also a direct descendant of the vaquero of California and Mexico. Experts in Hawaiian etymology believe "Paniolo" is a Hawaiianized pronunciation of español. (The Hawaiian language has no /s/ sound, and all syllables and words must end in a vowel.) Paniolo, like cowboys on the mainland of North America, learned their skills from Mexican vaqueros.

By the early 19th century, Capt. George Vancouver's gift of cattle to Pai`ea Kamehameha, monarch of the Hawaiian Kingdom, had multiplied astonishingly, and were wreaking havoc throughout the countryside. About 1812, John Parker, a sailor who had jumped ship and settled in the islands, received permission from Kamehameha to capture the wild cattle and develop a beef industry.

The Hawaiian style of ranching originally included capturing wild cattle by driving them into pits dug in the forest floor. Once tamed somewhat by hunger and thirst, they were hauled out up a steep ramp, and tied by their horns to the horns of a tame, older steer (or ox) that knew where the paddock with food and water was located. The industry grew slowly under the reign of Kamehameha's son Liholiho (Kamehameha II). Later, Liholiho's brother, Kauikeaouli (Kamehameha III), visited California, then still a part of Mexico. He was impressed with the skill of the Mexican vaqueros, and invited several to Hawaii in 1832 to teach the Hawaiian people how to work cattle.

Even today, traditional paniolo dress, as well as certain styles of Hawaiian formal attire, reflect the Spanish heritage of the vaquero. The traditional Hawaiian saddle, the noho lio, and many other tools of the cowboy's trade have a distinctly Mexican/Spanish look and many Hawaiian ranching families still carry the names of the vaqueros who married Hawaiian women and made Hawaii their home.

See also
 Campino
 Charro
 Gaucho
 Vaqueros de Alzada, northern Spanish nomadic people
 Western lifestyle

References

Sources
Bennett, Deb (1998) Conquerors: The Roots of New World Horsemanship. Amigo Publications Inc; 1st edition. 
 
 Cowan, Robert G. (1977) "Ranchos of California, a list of Spanish Concessions 1775-1822 and Mexican Grants 1822-1846". Academy Library Guild, Fresno, Calif
 Draper, Robert. "21st-Century Cowboys: Why the Spirit Endures."  National Geographic, December 2007, pp. 114–135.
 Lehman, Tim. "The Making of the Cowboy Myth". The Saturday Evening Post, vol. 292, no. 1, Jan. 2020, pp. 80–83.
 Malone, John William. An Album of the American Cowboy.  New York:  Franklin Watts, Inc., 1971. SBN: 531-01512-2.
 Miller, Robert W. (1974) Horse Behavior and Training. Big Sky Books, Montana State University, Bozeman, MT
 
 
 Vernam, Glenn R. Man on Horseback. New York: Harper & Row 1964.

External links

Animal husbandry occupations
Equestrian history
Horse-related professions and professionals
Mexican culture
Western (genre) staples and terminology